BBQ Pitmasters is an American reality television series which follows barbecue cooks as they compete for cash and prizes in barbecue cooking competitions.

The series premiered on TLC on December 3, 2009. The eight-episode first season was filmed in a docu-reality format as it followed several competing BBQ teams around the country to various BBQ contests.

Season two premiered on August 12, 2010 at 10 pm EDT featuring a completely new competition game show-based format. Each week, four teams competed against each other. Challenges included common protein and more exotic meat. Weekly winners faced off against each other in the second-season finale as they vied for $100,000 and the Kingsford Cup. The judges for the second season were Myron Mixon, Art Smith, and Warren Sapp. Kevin Roberts served as host.

On January 29, 2012, Myron Mixon confirmed on his Facebook account for Jack's Old South that filming for Season 3 would start in March. On April 4, 2012, it was announced that Season 3 would air on Destination America, which is a rebranded version of the Planet Green channel that launched on May 26, 2012.

On May 26, 2014, Destination America debuted a preview of their new TV series named BBQ Pit Wars. The episode first aired on May 31, 2014. This new reality show uses the old docu-reality format of BBQ Pitmasters season 1 (many viewers had voiced their preference for this format on the channel's website), in which Myron Mixon is one of the team competitors rather than a BBQ judge. Along with Stump McDowell of Stump's BBQ, Moe Cason of Ponderosa BBQ, and Michael Character of Character BBQ, the four teams compete in regional BBQ championships around the nation, for prizes, and bragging rights to be named the master of BBQ.

Series overview

Season 1

Season 1: Teams
 Jack's Old South, led by Myron Mixon
 Smokin' Triggers BBQ, led by Johnny Trigg
 Slap Yo' Daddy BBQ, led by Harry Soo
 Cool Smoke, led by Tuffy Stone
 Wood Chick's BBQ, owned by Lee Ann Whippen
 Jambo Pits, led by Jamie Geer
 Pablo Diablo's, led by Paul Petersen, a recognized Texas chef but BBQ rookie.
 Notley Que BBQ led by Gary Notley

Season 2

Season 2: Judges
 Myron Mixon—season one competitor and owner of Jack's Old South
 Art Smith—celebrity chef and author of Back to the Table and Kitchen Life
 Warren Sapp—Super Bowl champion and barbecue enthusiast

Contestants

Season 2: Preliminary Results (Ep. 1-5)

Season 2: Final Results (Ep. 6)

Season 3
In this season, three teams compete in each episode. The winning team will move on to the championship round, where they will compete for a $50,000 prize.

Season 3: Judges
 Myron Mixon
 Tuffy Stone
 Aaron Franklin, the owner and pitmaster of Franklin Barbecue

Contestants

Season 3: Preliminary Results (Ep. 1-5)

Season 3: Final Results (Ep. 6)

Season 4
This season features individual regional BBQ style competitions. Each episode crowned a regional champion of the BBQ style for that state. Three local teams compete for bragging rights, and a $2,000 prize donated by Jack's Old South. There is no overall BBQ champion at the end of season 4. The last episode has Myron Mixon competing against his son Michael.

Season 4: Judges
 Myron Mixon
 Tuffy Stone
 (Aaron Franklin)

Contestants

Season 4: Episode Results

Season 5
This season the BBQ competition returns to the previous elimination format. Three teams from around the country compete in each episode, and the winning teams advance to the finale. The overall grand BBQ champion wins a $50,000 prize.

Season 5: Judges
 Myron Mixon
 Tuffy Stone
 (3rd Judge changes in each episode)

Contestants

Season 5: Episode Results

Season 6
All Season 6 episodes were filmed in a single location in Florida.

Season 6: Judges
 Myron Mixon
 Tuffy Stone
 Moe Cason

Contestants

Season 6: Preliminary Results (Ep. 1-6)

Season 6: Semi-Final Results (Ep. 7-8)

Season 6: Final Results (Episode 9)

References

External links
 Official website

2009 American television series debuts
2015 American television series endings
2000s American cooking television series
2010s American cooking television series
TLC (TV network) original programming
Barbecue
English-language television shows
Destination America original programming